The 1st Session of the 11th National People's Congress held its annual meeting from March 5 to March 18, 2008 in the Great Hall of the People in Beijing, China, in conjunction with the 2008 CPPCC.

The 10-day plenum elected China's new government leaders. Up for confirmation for a second term were President Hu Jintao and Premier Wen Jiabao. The State Council went through important personnel and structural changes following the 17th Party Congress. Zeng Qinghong's Vice-Presidency came to an end and the position was taken by Xi Jinping. Three new Vice-Premiers were confirmed and took office, with rising star Li Keqiang ranking first in this group.

Government Report
Premier Wen Jiabao delivered the government report on March 5, 2008, reviewing the work from the past five years. The main points that come out of the report were

 Rebuilding of snowstorm hit areas in Southern China. Rebuild power, communications and water infrastructure in Hunan, Anhui, Guangdong, Sichuan and Hebei.
 Control of inflation and maintain price stability for basic necessities, food and essential commodities.
 Regulation of excessive investments in fixed assets.
 Education reforms which include free nine years of education and education initiatives to assist with the rural regions.
 Increase resources towards energy conservation, more efficient technologies and reduction of emissions.

State Council Reform
A massive reform took place in China's cabinet, the State Council of the People's Republic of China. Several ministries were consolidated to form super ministries. The several "superministries"

The state council will also create the National Energy Commission which will oversee national energy strategy, security and development. While the National Development and Reform Commission will continue to control the administration and regulation of the energy sector.

The State Food and Drug Administration will be incorporated and come under the jurisdiction of the Ministry of Health. Therefore, the Health ministry will take over the responsibility for food and drug safety.

The People's Bank of China will increase its coordination role between all the financial executive agencies, namely the National Development and Reform Commission and the Finance ministry.

Election results

 No other candidates formally stood for these positions, although votes were cast for other write-in candidates.

Premier's Press Conference
Premier Wen Jiabao held a press conference on March 18, 2008. He introduced the new Vice-Premiers, Li Keqiang, Hui Liangyu, Zhang Dejiang and Wang Qishan. Wen addressed the direction of the government in the next five years. He also addressed the ongoing Tibetan protests. Wen asserted that the Dalai Lama was "masterminding" the protests in Tibet. Wen said that 2008 could be a very difficult year for the Chinese economy because of both international and domestic reasons.

See also
 National People's Congress

Notes

External links
NPC Official Website
News Centre of the 2008 National People's Congress

Congress
National People's Congresses